Lysus was a Macedonian sculptor, mentioned by Pausanias, as the creator of the statue of Criannius of Elis, an Olympic victor who won a victory in the race in armour. This statue stood in the Altis, a sanctuary at Olympia, the site of the Olympic Games.

References

Online Reading 
Classical E-text : Pausanias
Smith, Dictionary of Greek and Roman Biography and Mythology  : Lysus

Ancient Greek sculptors
Ancient Olympia
Ancient Macedonian sculptors